Alena Vránová (born 30 July 1932) is a Czech film and theatre actress. At the 1997 Thalia Awards she won the category of Best Actress in a Play. She studied at the Faculty of Theatre (Prague). Vránová was recognised with an award for lifetime achievement in theatre at the 2016 Thalia Awards.

Selected filmography
Thanks for Every New Morning (1994)
Konec cesty (1960)
Lost Children (1956)
Playing with the Devil (1956)
Dovolená s Andělem (1952)
The Proud Princess (1952)

References

External links

1932 births
Living people
Czech film actresses
Czechoslovak film actresses
Actresses from Prague
20th-century Czech actresses
21st-century Czech actresses
Czechoslovak stage actresses
Czech stage actresses
Recipients of the Thalia Award